Anna Spyridopoulou (born 2 November 1988) is a Greek professional basketball player who plays for Olympiacos and Greece women's national basketball team. She has represented national team in EuroBasket Women 2011.

References

External links
FIBA Europe profile

1988 births
Living people
Expatriate basketball people in Sweden
Greek expatriate sportspeople in Sweden
Greek women's basketball players
Olympiacos Women's Basketball players
Basketball players from Serres
Small forwards